Penelope Dalton is an artist, critic and writer.

Education
Dalton trained at Goldsmiths, University of London and Brighton University and gained a PhD in Creative studies from Plymouth University in 2008.

Career
Dalton taught studio practice and critical theory at Dartington College of Arts and Birmingham City University.

Dalton spent many years as an academic researcher in socially contextualised practice in printmaking and art education, drawing on feminist and linguistic theory. In recent years she has eschewed 'theory'.  The arts - she now believes - are being absorbed within the economies of entertainment, social welfare and consumerism. Her recent work returns to a modernist approach, and focusses on the materiality of painting as an imaginative practice of analogy and poetics.

Exhibitions

Solo exhibitions 

 "Different strokes" Westminster Reference Library. London, (2017) 
 "Paint Jobs"  St Marylebone Parish Church Crypt, London (2015)
 "Stuff and Nonsense" Tokarska Gallery, London (2014)

Group exhibitions 

 "Contemporary Painting: In Good Health". (2017) The Menier Gallery, London 
 "Stations of the Cross" Brentwood Cathedral (2015) 
 "Contemporary British Abstraction" SE9 Container Gallery, London (2015) 
 "Contemporary British Painting" Huddersfield Art Gallery (2014)
 "@PaintBritain" Ipswich Art School Gallery, Ipswich Museum (2014) 
 "Artness" Artmeet Gallery, Milan, Italy (2014)
 "A World to Win: Posters of Protest and Revolution" Victoria and Albert Museum, London (2014) William Morris Gallery (2016) 
 "Propaganda Posters From the Schreyer Collection" Victoria and Albert Museum, London (2002)
 "Exposition de Grabado Contemporaneo [Eight contemporary women printmakers]" Circulo de Bellas Artes, Madrid, Spain British Council.(1998)
 "The Power of the Poster" Victoria and Albert Museum, London (1998)
 "Women's Art"  Spacex (art gallery), Exeter (1989)
 "Prints With a Point" Hard Times Gallery, Bristol (1987)
 "3 Women Artists" Battersea Arts Centre, London (1984)
 "Reflections: 5 Women Artists" Aspex Gallery, Portsmouth (1982)

Collections 

Musée de la Publicité, Paris
Komechak Art Gallery, Chicago
The Priseman Seabrook Collection
Swindon Art Gallery
Victoria and Albert Museum London
The Working Class Archive 
Goldsmiths Archives catalogue
Feminist Archive South, UK.

Publications 

 (2008) Pen Dalton: Doctoral thesis: Family and Other Relations:
 (2006) Pen Dalton: ' "Like"'  in Henry Rogers, (ed.) Art Becomes You: Parody, Pastiche and the Politics of Art: Materiality in a Post-material Paradigm. BIAD/IKON Gallery. Article Press. 
(2006)Pen Dalton:  'Where is 'the subject' of contextual practice?' in The Journal of Visual Art Practice, Intellect Publishers. vol. 3 no 1  
(2006) Pen Dalton:  'Feminist Methodologies in Art Education: Critique' in The International Journal, n.paradoxa, vol. 17, pp 72–76.  
(2003) Pen Dalton: critical essay: 'Losing it' in Lloyd Lewis, P. and Shaffrey C., (eds) Losing It:  a catalogue for an exhibition of screen based video, Fenton Gallery, Cork, Eire. pp. 1–4. Article Press. 
(2001) Pen Dalton. book: The Gendering of Art Education : Modernism, Identity and Critical Feminism.
(1999) Pen Dalton: 'Oedipal dramas in art education' in The International Journal of Art and Design Education. vol.18 no 3 October. pp. 301–306 
(1995) Pen Dalton: 'Modernism, art education and sexual difference' in Barrie, P. and Deepwell, K ads. New Feminist Art Criticism. Manchester University Press.
(1992) Pen Dalton: 'Psychology and the subject of art education' in J& J Swift (ends) Disciplines, Fields, Change in Art Education, vol 3 Article Press. pp. 83–96 
(1979) Pen Dalton: 'What is art education for? Feminist Art News no 1 Spring.  (1980) 'What is art education for? (reprinted) Pollock G and Parker, R. (eds) Framing Feminism: Art and the Women's Movement. 1970-85. Pandora 
(1978) Pen Dalton: 'Feminist art practice and the mass media' in Feminist Arts News, no 1; reprinted (1979) in Women's Studies International Journal vol 3 no 1, reprinted (1980) in Baerh, H. (ed) Women and Media, Oxford, Pergamon Press

Further reading

 (2017) Contemporary Masters from Britain: 80 British Painters of the 21st Century. Seabrook Press.
 (2009)  Frizell, Hazel Representations of specific concerns of the women's liberation movement in British feminist art 1970-1978. 
 (2002) Doy, Gen. Drapery: Classicism and Barbarism in Visual Culture  
 (1997) Timmers, M.(ed) The Power of the Poster, V & A publications.pp 140 – 141.  
 (1993) Phillipe R. (ed) Political Graphics: Art As a Weapon. Phaidon. p 300

References

1944 births
Living people
Alumni of the University of Plymouth
21st-century British painters
Alumni of Goldsmiths, University of London
21st-century British women artists